An "old salt" is an old sailor or mariner who tells oral history and sea stories. Sometimes deemed a sage within their domain, and while sometimes a raconteur, much of the history and traditions of mariners are passed from generation to generation as told and retold by old salts. Their factual oral histories and fictional sea stories often intermingle and thus may overall be truthful, half-true, or fiction. Each narrative told by an old salt tends to have the aim of enhancing the reputation of the old salt, the old salt's companions, or the old salt's forbearers, although they may also tell instructive tales of tragedy.

United States military title

In the United States Navy, the "Old Salt" is a title passed to the longest-serving Surface Warfare Officer on active duty. The award, currently held by Admiral Christopher W. Grady, honors the officer with the earliest standing SWO qualification.

List of titleholders

References

Nautical terminology
Storytellers